Mechanic Settlement is a community in Kings County, New Brunswick, Canada. Its population is approximately 100. It is beside Fundy National Park on Route 114.

History

It was founded in 1843 by a group of mechanics and laborers from Saint John, New Brunswick.

It had a post office, from 1853 to 1928.

In November 2010, the community received more than 291mm of rain.

Notable people

See also
List of communities in New Brunswick

References

Communities in Kings County, New Brunswick
Populated places established in 1843
1843 establishments in New Brunswick